Bloodthirsty (or The Bloodthirsty Trilogy) is a 1970s Japanese vampire film trilogy produced by Toho Studio, consisting of three of their 1970s horror films: The Vampire Doll, Lake of Dracula and Evil of Dracula. While there is no plot connection between the films, they share a vampire theme. The films were all directed by Michio Yamamoto and co-written by Ei Ogawa.

All three films have been released on Blu-Ray in a box set from Arrow Video. This release included uncompressed mono audio, Toho's export English dubs for Lake of Dracula and Evil of Dracula, a video appraisal by Kim Newman, original trailers, and a collector's booklet in the first pressing.

List of films
 The Vampire Doll (1970) - released in Japan as Chi o Suu Ningyo (translation: The Bloodthirsty Doll), aka Legacy of Dracula
 Lake of Dracula (1971) - released in Japan as Chi o Suu Me (translation: Bloodthirsty Eyes)
 Evil of Dracula (1974) - released in Japan as Chi o Suu Bara (translation: The Bloodthirsty Rose)

References

Film series introduced in 1970
Japanese film series
Dracula film series
Japanese vampire films
1970 horror films
1970 films
1971 horror films
1971 films
1974 horror films
1974 films
Trilogies
1970s Japanese films